Euro proof sets are proof sets of the coins of the Euro. Proof coins were originally coins minted to test the dies used in the coin minting process and to archive sets of coins minted every year. Modern proof sets are minted in higher numbers and are sold to the public and numismatists for collecting. Modern proof coins are often minted using special processes in order to make the coins more aesthetically pleasing. Mints in countries in the European Union who use the Euro often make proof sets of the upcoming year's Euro coins. Sets from these countries are listed below.

Austria

Belgium

Cyprus

Finland

France

Germany

Greece

Ireland

Italy

Luxembourg

Malta

Monaco

Netherlands

Portugal

San Marino

Slovakia

Slovenia

Spain

Vatican

References

Euro coins